The Pointe de l'Échelle (3,442 m) is a mountain in the Vanoise Massif in Savoie, France.

References

Mountains of the Graian Alps
Alpine three-thousanders
Mountains of Savoie